The Serbian Embassy in Berlin is Serbia's diplomatic mission to Germany. It is located at Taubert Straße 18, DE-14193 in Berlin, Germany.

The current Serbian ambassador to Germany is Dušan Crnogorčević.

Consulates 
There are several consulates located throughout Germany:
 Consulate General in Frankfurt (Consul General Branko Radovanović)
 Consulate General in Hamburg (Consul General Nataša Rašević)
 Consulate General in Munich (Consul General Snežana Miljanić)
 Consulate General in Stuttgart (Consul General Božidar Vučurović)
 Consulate General in Düsseldorf (Consul General Branislava Perin Jarić)

See also 
Germany–Serbia relations
List of Ambassadors from Serbia
Foreign relations of Serbia

External links 
 Serbian Embassy in Berlin 
 Serbian Consulates General in Germany

Berlin
Serbia
Germany–Serbia relations